Yum may refer to:

People
Ren (surname), romanized as Yum or Yam in Cantonese
Yum Dong-kyun (born in 1950), South Korean boxer
Yum Jung-ah (born in 1972), South Korean actress

Other uses
 Quechan language, (ISO 639 language code "yum")
 Yugoslav dinar, former currency (between 1994 and 2003) with the ISO 4217 code "YUM" 
 Yum! Brands, a corporation that operates Taco Bell, KFC, and Pizza Hut
 Yuma International Airport (IATA code YUM), in Yuma, Arizona
 yum (software), an open-source command-line package-management tool for Linux operating systems

See also
 Yum Yum (disambiguation)
 Yuma (disambiguation)
 Yummy (disambiguation)